DMJ may refer to:
 Duke Mathematical Journal, a peer-reviewed mathematics journal
 Global Air (Mexico), the ICAO code DMJ
 DMJ Pick Bridge, a Parker through truss bridge located near Saratoga, Wyoming
 Diploma in Medical Jurisprudence, a postgraduate diploma program to train and equip medical graduates